Tylden is a town in central Victoria, Australia in the Shire of Macedon Ranges local government area,  north-west of the state capital, Melbourne. Tylden is on Dja Dja Wurrung country.

History
Tylden Post Office opened on 7 January 1860.

Notable RAAF pilot Joe Hewitt was born here.

Today
Tylden is home to the large Woodside Park Stud thoroughbred racehorse pre-training facility established at a cost of A$20m. The training facility was strongly opposed by residents over many years of public matters. In recent years it has been taken over by Mark Rowsthorn  and is focusing on the breeding of thoroughbreds rather than a racing stable. Wadham Park is now known as Woodside Park Stud.

See also

Former Tylden railway station

References

Towns in Victoria (Australia)
Shire of Macedon Ranges